Tocra (possibly from Quechua for faded, discolored, pale) is a mountain in the Vilcanota mountain range in the Andes of Peru, about  high. It is situated in the Puno Region, Carabaya Province, on the border of the districts Corani and Ollachea. Tocra lies east of the mountain Macho Ritti and northeast of the mountain Ananta. The lakes Mancacocha and Jomercocha lie south of Tocra.

References

Mountains of Peru
Mountains of Puno Region